Prunskienė Cabinet was the 1st cabinet of Lithuania since the declaration of independence in 1990. It consisted of the Prime Minister and 17 government ministers.

Kazimiera Prunskienė was appointed as the first Prime Minister by the Supreme Council of Lithuania on 17 January 1990, six days after declararing the independence. During the next year, the government worked on securing the Lithuanian independence, rather than introducing substantial reforms. Economic crisis and rising prices led to dissatisfaction with the government and its dismissal on 10 January 1991, in the opening stages of the January events.

It was the only government in history of independent Lithuania to have two deputy prime ministers.

Cabinet
The following ministers served on the Prunskienė Cabinet.

References 

Cabinet of Lithuania
1990 establishments in Lithuania
1991 disestablishments in Lithuania
Cabinets established in 1990
Cabinets disestablished in 1991